20th Century Studios (previously known as 20th Century Fox Film Corporation, or 20th Century Fox for short) is an American film production company headquartered at the Fox Studio Lot in the Century City area of Los Angeles. Since 2019, it serves as a film production arm of Walt Disney Studios, a division of Disney Entertainment, which is owned by The Walt Disney Company. Walt Disney Studios Motion Pictures distributes and markets the films produced by 20th Century Studios in theatrical markets.

For over 80 years – beginning with its founding in 1935 and ending in 2019 (when it became part of Walt Disney Studios) – 20th Century Fox was one of the then "Big Six" major American film studios. It was formed in 1935 from the merger of the Fox Film Corporation and Twentieth Century Pictures and was originally known as the Twentieth Century-Fox Film Corporation (while owned by TCF Holdings) as one of the original Big Five among eight majors of Hollywood's Golden Age. In 1985, the studio removed the hyphen in the name and renamed as Twentieth Century Fox Film Corporation, after being acquired by Rupert Murdoch's News Corporation, which was shut down and replaced by 21st Century Fox in 2013, after spinning off its publishing assets. The acquisition of 21st Century Fox by Disney took place on March 20, 2019, including 20th Century Fox. The studio's current name was adopted on January 17, 2020, to avoid confusion with Fox Corporation. On December 4, 2020, the company started using 20th Century Studios, Inc. for the copyright of 20th Century Studios and Searchlight Pictures productions as a Disney subsidiary.

History

From founding to 1956 

Twentieth Century Pictures' Joseph Schenck and Darryl F. Zanuck left United Artists over a stock dispute, and began merger talks with the management of financially struggling Fox Film, under President Sidney Kent.

Spyros Skouras, then manager of the Fox West Coast Theaters, helped make it happen (and later became president of the new company). The company had been struggling since founder William Fox lost control of the company in 1930.

Fox Film Corporation and Twentieth Century Pictures merged in 1935. Initially, it was speculated in The New York Times that the newly merged company would be named "Fox-Twentieth Century". The new company, Twentieth Century-Fox Film Corporation, began trading on May 31, 1935. Kent remained at the company, joining Schenck and Zanuck. Zanuck replaced Winfield Sheehan as the company's production chief.

The company established a special training school. Lynn Bari, Patricia Farr and Anne Nagel were among 14 young women "launched on the trail of film stardom" on August 6, 1935, when they each received a six-month contract with 20th Century-Fox after spending 18 months in the school. The contracts included a studio option for renewal for as long as seven years.

For many years, 20th Century Fox identified themselves as having been founded in 1915, the year Fox Film was founded. For instance, it marked 1945 as its 30th anniversary. However, it has considered the 1935 merger as its founding in recent years, even though most film historians agree it was founded in 1915. The company's films retained the 20th Century Pictures searchlight logo on their opening credits as well as its opening fanfare, but with the name changed to 20th Century-Fox.

After the merger was completed, Zanuck signed young actors to help carry 20th Century-Fox: Tyrone Power, Linda Darnell, Carmen Miranda, Don Ameche, Henry Fonda, Gene Tierney, Sonja Henie, and Betty Grable. 20th Century-Fox also hired Alice Faye and Shirley Temple, who appeared in several major films for the studio in the 1930s.

Higher attendance during World War II helped 20th Century-Fox overtake RKO and Metro-Goldwyn-Mayer to become the third most profitable film studio. In 1941, Zanuck was commissioned as a lieutenant colonel in the U.S. Signal Corps and assigned to supervise the production of U.S. Army training films. His partner, William Goetz, filled in at 20th Century-Fox.

In 1942, Spyros Skouras succeeded Kent as president of the studio. During the next few years, with pictures like Wilson (1944), The Razor's Edge (1946), Boomerang, Gentleman's Agreement (both 1947), The Snake Pit (1948), and Pinky (1949), Zanuck established a reputation for provocative, adult films. 20th Century-Fox also specialized in adaptations of best-selling books such as Ben Ames Williams' Leave Her to Heaven (1945), starring Gene Tierney, which was the highest-grossing 20th Century-Fox film of the 1940s. The studio also produced film versions of Broadway musicals, including the Rodgers and Hammerstein films, beginning with the musical version of State Fair (1945), the only work that the partnership wrote specially for films.

After the war, audiences slowly drifted away. 20th Century-Fox held on to its theaters until a court-mandated "divorce"; they were spun off as Fox National Theaters in 1953. That year, with attendance at half the 1946 level, 20th Century-Fox gambled on an unproven process. Noting that the two film sensations of 1952 had been Cinerama, which required three projectors to fill a giant curved screen, and "Natural Vision" 3D, which got its effects of depth by requiring the use of polarized glasses, 20th Century-Fox mortgaged its studio to buy rights to a French anamorphic projection system which gave a slight illusion of depth without glasses. President Spyros Skouras struck a deal with the inventor Henri Chrétien, leaving the other film studios empty-handed, and in 1953 introduced CinemaScope in the studio's groundbreaking feature film The Robe.

Zanuck announced in February 1953 that henceforth all 20th Century-Fox pictures would be made in CinemaScope. To convince theater owners to install this new process, 20th Century-Fox agreed to help pay conversion costs (about $25,000 per screen); and to ensure enough product, 20th Century-Fox leased access to CinemaScope to any rival studio choosing to use it. Seeing the box-office for the first two CinemaScope features, The Robe and How to Marry a Millionaire (also 1953), Warner Bros., MGM, RKO, Universal-International, Columbia, UA, Allied Artists, and Disney quickly adopted the process. In 1956, 20th Century-Fox engaged Robert Lippert to establish a subsidiary company, Regal Pictures, later Associated Producers Incorporated to film B pictures in CinemaScope (but "branded" RegalScope). 20th Century-Fox produced new musicals using the CinemaScope process including Carousel and The King and I (both 1956).

CinemaScope brought a brief upturn in attendance, but by 1956 the numbers again began to slide. That year Darryl Zanuck announced his resignation as head of production. Zanuck moved to Paris, setting up as an independent producer, seldom being in the United States for many years.

Production and financial problems 

Zanuck's successor, producer Buddy Adler, died a year later. President Spyros Skouras brought in a series of production executives, but none had Zanuck's success. By the early 1960s, 20th Century-Fox was in trouble. A new version of Cleopatra (1963) began production in 1959 with Joan Collins in the lead. As a publicity gimmick, producer Walter Wanger offered $1 million to Elizabeth Taylor if she would star; she accepted and costs for Cleopatra began to escalate. Richard Burton's on-set romance with Taylor was surrounding the media. However, Skouras' selfish preferences and inexperienced micromanagement on the film's production did nothing to speed up production on Cleopatra.

Meanwhile, another remake—of the Cary Grant hit My Favorite Wife (1940)—was rushed into production in an attempt to turn over a quick profit to help keep 20th Century-Fox afloat. The romantic comedy entitled Something's Got to Give paired Marilyn Monroe, 20th Century-Fox's most bankable star of the 1950s, with Dean Martin and director George Cukor. The troubled Monroe caused delays daily, and it quickly descended into a costly debacle. As Cleopatras budget passed $10 million, eventually costing around $40 million, 20th Century-Fox sold its back lot (now the site of Century City) to Alcoa in 1961 to raise funds. After several weeks of script rewrites on the Monroe picture and very little progress, mostly due to director George Cukor's filming methods, in addition to Monroe's chronic sinusitis, Monroe was fired from Something's Got to Give and two months later she was found dead. According to 20th Century-Fox files, she was rehired within weeks for a two-picture deal totaling $1 million, $500,000 to finish Something's Got to Give (plus a bonus at completion), and another $500,000 for What a Way to Go. Elizabeth Taylor's disruptive reign on the Cleopatra set continued unchallenged from 1960 into 1962, though three 20th Century-Fox executives went to Rome in June 1962 to fire her. They learned that director Joseph L. Mankiewicz had filmed out of sequence and had only done interiors, so 20th Century-Fox was then forced to allow Taylor several more weeks of filming. In the meantime during that summer of 1962 Fox released nearly all of its contract stars to offset burgeoning costs, including Jayne Mansfield.

With few pictures on the schedule, Skouras wanted to rush Zanuck's big-budget war epic The Longest Day (1962), an accurate account of the Allied invasion of Normandy on June 6, 1944, with a huge international cast, into release as another source of quick cash. This offended Zanuck, still 20th Century-Fox's largest shareholder, for whom The Longest Day was a labor of love that he had dearly wanted to produce for many years. After it became clear that Something's Got to Give would not be able to progress without Monroe in the lead (Martin had refused to work with anyone else), Skouras finally decided that re-signing her was unavoidable. But days before filming was due to resume, she was found dead at her Los Angeles home and the picture resumed filming as Move Over, Darling, with Doris Day and James Garner in the leads. Released in 1963, the film was a hit. The unfinished scenes from Something's Got to Give were shelved for nearly 40 years. Rather than being rushed into release as if it were a B-picture, The Longest Day was lovingly and carefully produced under Zanuck's supervision. It was finally released at a length of three hours and was well received.

At the next board meeting, Zanuck spoke for eight hours, convincing directors that Skouras was mismanaging the company and that he was the only possible successor. Zanuck was installed as chairman, and then named his son Richard Zanuck as president. This new management group seized Cleopatra and rushed it to completion, shut down the studio, laid off the entire staff to save money, axed the long-running Movietone Newsreel (the archives of which are now owned by Fox News), and made a series of cheap, popular pictures that restored 20th Century-Fox as a major studio. The saving grace for the studio's fortunes came from the tremendous success of The Sound of Music (1965), an expensive and handsomely produced film adaptation of the highly acclaimed Rodgers and Hammerstein Broadway musical, which became a significant success at the box office and won five Academy Awards, including Best Director (Robert Wise) and Best Picture of the Year.

20th Century-Fox also had two big science-fiction hits in the decade: Fantastic Voyage (1966), and the original Planet of the Apes (1968), starring Charlton Heston, Kim Hunter, and Roddy McDowall. Fantastic Voyage was the last film made in CinemaScope; the studio had held on to the format while Panavision lenses were being used elsewhere.

Zanuck stayed on as chairman until 1971, but there were several expensive flops in his last years, resulting in 20th Century-Fox posting losses from 1969 to 1971. Following his removal, and after an uncertain period, new management brought 20th Century-Fox back to health. Under president Gordon T. Stulberg and production head Alan Ladd, Jr., 20th Century-Fox films connected with modern audiences. Stulberg used the profits to acquire resort properties, soft-drink bottlers, Australian theaters and other properties in an attempt to diversify enough to offset the boom-or-bust cycle of picture-making.

Foreshadowing a pattern of film production still yet to come, in late 1973 20th Century-Fox joined forces with Warner Bros. to co-produce The Towering Inferno (1974), an all-star action blockbuster from producer Irwin Allen. Both studios found themselves owning the rights to books about burning skyscrapers. Allen insisted on a meeting with the heads of both studios and announced that as 20th Century-Fox was already in the lead with their property it would be career suicide to have competing movies. Thus the first joint-venture studio deal was struck. In hindsight, while it may be commonplace now, back in the 1970s, it was a risky, but revolutionary, idea that paid off handsomely at both domestic and international box offices around the world.

20th Century-Fox's success reached new heights by backing the most profitable film made up to that time, Star Wars (1977). Substantial financial gains were realized as a result of the film's unprecedented success: from a low of $6 in June 1976, stock prices more than quadrupled to almost $27 after Star Wars release; 1976 revenues of $195  million rose to $301  million in 1977.

Marvin Davis and Rupert Murdoch 

With financial stability came new owners, when 20th Century-Fox was sold for $720 million on June 8, 1981, to investors Marc Rich and Marvin Davis. 20th Century-Fox's assets included Pebble Beach Golf Links, the Aspen Skiing Company and a Century City property upon which Davis built and twice sold Fox Plaza.

By 1984, Rich had become a fugitive from justice, having fled to Switzerland after being charged by U.S. federal prosecutors with tax evasion, racketeering and illegal trading with Iran during the Iran hostage crisis. Rich's assets were frozen by U.S. authorities. In 1984 Marvin Davis bought out Marc Rich's 50% interest in 20th Century-Fox Film Corporation for an undisclosed amount, reported to be $116 million. Davis sold this interest to Rupert Murdoch's News Corporation for $250 million in March 1985. Davis later backed out of a deal with Murdoch to purchase John Kluge's Metromedia television stations. Murdoch went ahead alone and bought the stations, and later bought out Davis' remaining stake in 20th Century-Fox for $325 million. From 1985, the hyphen was permanently deleted from the brand name, with 20th Century-Fox changing to 20th Century Fox.

To gain FCC approval of 20th Century-Fox's purchase of Metromedia's television holdings, once the stations of the long-dissolved DuMont network, Murdoch had to become a U.S. citizen. He did so in 1985, and in 1986 the new Fox Broadcasting Company took to the air. Over the next 20-odd years the network and owned-stations group expanded to become extremely profitable for News Corporation. Then in 1993, 20th Century Fox bought the superhero rights to the X-Men, while the  Fantastic Four was bought in 1998. Then Bryan Singer directed the first film and the second film, while Brett Ratner was hired to direct the third film of the original trilogy.

In 1994, 20th Century Fox would establish four new divisions: Fox Searchlight Pictures, Fox Family Films, Fox Animation Studios, and Fox 2000 Pictures. Fox Searchlight would specialize in the specialty and indie film market, with Thomas Rothman, then president of production at The Samuel Goldwyn Company, being brought on to head up the new studio. It was soon given its name with Rothman as its founding president. Fox Family Films was tasked with producing films geared towards families, under John Matoian. Fox Animation Studios was established on August 9, 1994, designed to compete with Walt Disney Feature Animation, whom had found success in the Disney Renaissance. Don Bluth and Gary Goldman of the failing Sullivan Bluth Studios were appointed to head the new $100 million animation studio. Fox 2000 Pictures was formed to specialize in mid-budget-ranging films targeted towards underserved groups of audiences, with Laura Ziskin brought on as president.

In August 1997, Fox's Los Angeles-based visual effects company, VIFX, acquired majority interest in Blue Sky Studios to form a new visual effects and animation company, temporarily renamed "Blue Sky/VIFX". Blue Sky had previously did the character animation of MTV Films' first film Joe's Apartment. Following the studio's expansion, Blue Sky produced character animation for the films Alien Resurrection, A Simple Wish, Mouse Hunt, Star Trek: Insurrection and Fight Club. VIFX was later sold to another VFX studio Rhythm and Hues Studios in March 1999. According to Blue Sky founder Chris Wedge, Fox considered selling Blue Sky as well by 2000 due to financial difficulties in the visual effects industry in general.

In February 1998, following the success of Fox Animation Studios' first film Anastasia, Fox Family Films changed its name to Fox Animation Studios and dropped its live action production. which would be picked up by other production units. The actual Fox Animation Studios would become a division of the formerly-named Fox Family Films, being referred to as the Phoenix studio. However, Fox Animation Studios in Los Angeles would be renamed to 20th Century Fox Animation between 1998 and 1999. The Phoenix studio would face financial problems, eventually with Fox laying off 300 of the nearly 380 people who worked at the Phoenix studio to "make films more efficiently". After the box-office failure of Titan A.E., Fox Animation Studios would shut down on June 26, 2000. Their last film set to be made would have been an adaptation of Wayne Barlowe's illustrated novel Barlowe's Inferno, and was set to be done entirely with computer animation. Another film they would have made was The Little Beauty King, an adult animated film directed by Steve Oedekerk, which would have been a satire of the films from the Disney Renaissance. It would predate Shrek (2001).

Chris Wedge, film producer Lori Forte, and Fox Animation executive Chris Meledandri presented Fox with a script for a comedy feature film titled Ice Age. Studio management pressured staff to sell their remaining shares and options to Fox on the promise of continued employment on feature-length films. The studio moved to White Plains, New York and started production on Ice Age. As the film wrapped, Fox, having little faith in the film, feared that it might bomb at the box office. Fox terminated half of the production staff and tried unsuccessfully to find a buyer for the film and the studio. Instead, Ice Age was released by Fox in conjunction with 20th Century Fox Animation on March 15, 2002, to critical and commercial success, receiving a nomination for an Academy Award for Best Animated Feature at the 75th Academy Awards in 2003. Ice Age would spawn a franchise and bolster Blue Sky into producing feature films and becoming a household name in feature animation.

From 2000 to 2010, this company has been the international distributor for MGM/UA releases. In the 1980s, 20th Century Fox – through a joint venture with CBS called CBS/Fox Video – had distributed certain UA films on video; thus UA has come full circle by switching to 20th Century Fox for video distribution. 20th Century Fox also makes money distributing films for small independent film companies.

In 2006, 20th Century Fox terminated its production with Bad Hat Harry Productions for 5 years, because Bryan Singer left X-Men: The Last Stand to direct Superman Returns (2006) for Warner Bros. Pictures, then he returned to direct the first film and its sequel in the beginnings trilogy, starting in 2011.

In late 2006, Fox Atomic was started up under Fox Searchlight head Peter Rice and COO John Hegeman as a sibling production division under Fox Filmed Entertainment. In early 2008, Atomic's marketing unit was transferred to Fox Searchlight and 20th Century Fox, when Hegeman moved to New Regency Productions. Debbie Liebling became president. After two middling successes and falling short with other films, the unit was shut down in April 2009. The remaining films under its Atomic label in production and post-productions were transferred to 20th Century Fox and Fox Spotlight with Liebling overseeing them.

In 2008, 20th Century Fox announced an Asian subsidiary, Fox STAR Studios, a joint venture with STAR TV, also owned by News Corporation. It was reported that Fox STAR would start by producing films for the Bollywood market, then expand to several Asian markets. In the same year, 20th Century Fox started Fox International Productions, but the division was closed in 2017.

Chernin Entertainment was founded by Peter Chernin after he stepped down as president of 20th Century Fox's then-parent company News Corporation. in 2009. Chernin Entertainment's five-year first-look deal for the film and television was signed with 20th Century Fox and 20th Century Fox TV in 2009.

21st Century Fox era 
On June 28, 2012, Rupert Murdoch announced that News Corporation would be split into two publishing and media-oriented companies: a new News Corporation and 21st Century Fox, which operates the Fox Entertainment Group and 20th Century Fox. Murdoch considered the name of the new company a way to maintain the 20th Century Fox's heritage.

Fox Stage Productions was formed in June 2013. In August, the same year, 20th Century Fox started a theatrical joint venture with a trio of producers, both film and theater, Kevin McCollum, John Davis and Tom McGrath.

On September 20, 2017, Locksmith Animation formed a multi-year production deal with 20th Century Fox, who would distribute Locksmith's films under 20th Century Fox Animation, with Locksmith aiming to release a film every 12–18 months. The deal was to bolster Blue Sky's output and replace the loss of distributing DreamWorks Animation films. The first film to be released under the production company was Ron's Gone Wrong, which was released on October 22, 2021, by 20th Century Studios and was the only film to be released by the studio.

Technoprops, a VFX company that worked on Avatar and The Jungle Book, was purchased in April 2017 to operate as Fox VFX Lab. Technoprops' founder Glenn Derry would continue to run the company as vice president of visual effect reporting to Gerard Bevan and John Kilkenny, VFX president.

On October 30, 2017, Vanessa Morrison was named president of a newly created 20th Century Fox division, Fox Family, reporting to the chairman & CEO and Vice Chairman of 20th Century Fox. The family division would develop films that appeal to younger moviegoers and their parents both animated films and films with live-action elements. Also, the division would oversee the studio's family animated television business, which produces holiday television specials based on existing film properties, and oversee feature film adaptation of its TV shows. To replace Morrison at Fox Animation, Andrea Miloro and Robert Baird were named co-presidents of 20th Century Fox Animation.

20th Century Fox issued a default notice in regards to its licensing agreement for the under-construction 20th Century Fox World theme park in Malaysia by Genting Malaysia Bhd. In November 2018 Genting Malaysia filed suit in response and included soon to be parent The Walt Disney Company.

Disney acquisition 

On December 14, 2017, The Walt Disney Company announced plans to purchase most of the 21st Century Fox assets, including 20th Century Fox, for $52.4 billion. After a bid from Comcast (parent company of NBCUniversal) for $65 billion, Disney counterbid with $71.3 billion. On July 19, 2018, Comcast dropped out of the bid for 21st Century Fox in favor of Sky plc and Sky UK. Eight days later, Disney and 21st Century Fox shareholders approved the merger between the two companies. Although the deal was completed on March 20, 2019, 20th Century Fox was not planning to relocate to Walt Disney Studios in Burbank, but retained its headquarters at the Fox Studio Lot in the Century City area of Los Angeles, which is currently leased to Disney by 21st Century Fox's successor, Fox Corporation, for seven years. Various units were moved out from under 20th Century Fox at acquisition in months after the merger along with several rounds of layoffs. The Fox Research Library was folded into the Walt Disney Archives and Walt Disney Imagineering Archives in January 2020. The last film to use the "20th Century Fox" name was Underwater, which was released on January 10, 2020.

After the box office failures of films like Dark Phoenix and Stuber, Disney halted development on several projects, though films such as Free Guy and the Avatar sequels managed to continue production. Fox's slate would be reduced to 10 films per year, half of them being made for the Hulu and then-upcoming Disney+ streaming services. Projects from 20th Century Fox franchises such as Home Alone, Cheaper by the Dozen, Night at the Museum, Diary of the Wimpy Kid, and Ice Age were later announced for Disney+. These projects would later be fully revealed during Disney's Investor Day in December 2020 as feature films for the aforementioned streaming service. The first of these projects was Home Sweet Home Alone, which was released on November 12, 2021, and it became the first and only film released by 20th Century Fox on Disney+, as subsequent projects were transferred over to Walt Disney Pictures.

On January 17, 2020, Disney renamed the studio to "20th Century Studios", which served to help avoid brand confusion with the Fox Corporation. Similar to other Disney film units, distribution of 20th Century Studios films is now handled in North America by Walt Disney Studios Motion Pictures and internationally by their sub-division Buena Vista International, while Searchlight Pictures operates their own autonomous distribution and marketing unit. Walt Disney Studios Home Entertainment distributes the films produced by 20th Century and Searchlight in home media under the 20th Century Studios Home Entertainment label. The first film released by Disney under the studio's new name was The Call of the Wild, which was released on February 21, 2020. That same year, Ford vs. Ferrari (2019), among its four Academy Award nominations, earned the studio its first Best Picture nomination post-Disney acquisition.

In the same year, held-over production president Emma Watts left the company. On March 12, 2020, Steve Asbell was named president, production of 20th Century Studios, while Morrison was named president, streaming, Walt Disney Studios Motion Picture Production to oversee live-action development and production of Walt Disney Pictures and 20th Century Studios for Disney+. Philip Steuer will now lead physical and post-production and VFX, as president of production at Walt Disney Studios Motion Picture Production. Randi Hiller will now lead casting as executive VP casting, overseeing both Walt Disney Pictures and 20th Century Studios. Steuer has served as executive VP of physical production for Walt Disney Studios since 2015, and Hiller has led casting for Walt Disney Studios since 2011. Both will dual-report to Asbell and Sean Bailey.

On February 9, 2021, Disney announced that Blue Sky Studios was shut down in April 2021, and was succeeded by 20th Century Animation. A spokesperson for the company explained that in light of the ongoing COVID-19 pandemic's continued economic impact on all of its businesses, it was no longer sustainable for them to run a third feature animation studio. In addition, production on a film adaptation of the webcomic Nimona, originally scheduled to be released on January 14, 2022, was cancelled as a result of its closure. The studio's film library and intellectual properties are retained by Disney. Although Disney did not give an exact date as to when the studio would be closing down initially, former animator Rick Fournier confirmed on April 10 it was their last day of operation, three days after co-founder Chris Wedge released a farewell letter on social media. Nimona would be picked up by Annapurna Pictures in early 2022 for release on Netflix in 2023.

On November 22, 2021, Disney Media and Entertainment Distribution and WarnerMedia reached an agreement to allow select 20th Century Studios films be shared between Disney+, Hulu, and HBO Max through late 2022. The new agreement negotiated by Gerard Bevan and John Gelke is an amendment to the original agreement between 20th Century Fox and HBO that Disney inherited after its acquisition of Fox in 2019, and as such, is not expected to be renewed. Following the end of the 20th Century-HBO deal, Disney plans to retain the 20th Century films on their own streaming platforms going forward after 2022. The first film to this new strategy was Ron's Gone Wrong, while the last film was Amsterdam. Also in 2021, Disney had launched a video game based-studio 20th Century Games. Similar to its predecessors—FoxNext, Fox Interactive and 20th Century Fox Games—it acts as a distributor and has partnered with other tripa A game studios. Its first title was Aliens: Fireteam Elite.

On February 8, 2022, Steven Spielberg's 2021 film version of West Side Story, among its seven Academy Award nominations, earned 20th Century Studios its first Best Picture nomination post-rebranding.

On March 3, 2022, in an interview with The Hollywood Reporter, 20th Century Studios president Steve Asbell stated that they plan to be making 10+ films a year for streaming starting in 2023, with their films being released on Hulu domestically and both Disney+ via the Star hub and Star+ internationally, and that two to three films would be released theatrically each year.

In March 2023, it was announced that Marvel Comics would be launching a 20th Century Studios imprint, which will release comics based on 20th Century franchises. The first comic under the label will be a Planet of the Apes comic.

Television

20th Television is the television production division of 20th Century Studios. 20th Century Fox Television was the studio's television production division, along with Fox 21 Television Studios until they were renamed 20th Television and Touchstone Television (who later absorbed by 20th TV and spun off by Searchlight Television in December 2020) respectively in 2020. 20th Television was also the studio's television syndication division until it was folded into Disney-ABC Domestic Television in 2020.

During the mid-1950s, feature films were released to television in the hope that they would broaden sponsorship and help the distribution of network programs. Blocks of one-hour programming of feature films to national sponsors on 128 stations were organized by Twentieth Century Fox and National Telefilm Associates. Twentieth Century Fox received 50% interest in the NTA Film Network after it sold its library to National Telefilm Associates. This gave 90 minutes of cleared time a week and syndicated feature films (under the package title "Premiere Performance") to 110 non-interconnected stations for sale to national sponsors.

Buyout of Four Star 
Fox bought out the remaining assets of Four Star Television from Ronald Perelman's Compact Video in 1996. The majority of Four Star Television's library of programs are controlled by 20th Television today. After Murdoch's numerous buyouts during the buyout era of the eighties, News Corporation had built up financial debts of $7 billion (much from Sky TV in the UK), despite the many assets that were held by NewsCorp. The high levels of debt caused Murdoch to sell many of the American magazine interests he had acquired in the mid-1980s.

Music

Between 1933 and 1937, a custom record label called Fox Movietone was produced starting at F-100 and running through F-136. It featured songs from 20th Century Fox movies, first using material recorded and issued on Victor's Bluebird label and halfway through switched to material recorded and issued on ARC's dime store labels (Melotone, Perfect, etc.). These scarce records were sold only at Fox Theaters.

The music arm of 20th Century Fox, 20th Century Fox Records, was founded in 1958. It would go defunct in 1981.

Fox Records was the 20th Century Fox's music arm since 1992 before being renamed to Fox Music in 2000. It encompasses music publishing and licensing businesses, dealing primarily with Fox Entertainment Group's television and film soundtracks under license by Universal Music Group, EMI, Sony Music, and Warner Music Group. It would also go defunct on January 17, 2020, and was subsequently folded into Hollywood Records.

Radio 
The Twentieth Century Fox Presents radio series were broadcast between 1936 and 1942. More often than not, the shows were a radio preview featuring a medley of the songs and soundtracks from the latest movie being released into the theaters, much like the modern-day movie trailers we now see on TV, to encourage folks to head down to their nearest Picture House.

The radio shows featured the original stars, with the announcer narrating a lead-up that encapsulated the performance.

Motion picture film processing 
From its earliest ventures into movie production, Fox Film Corporation operated its own processing laboratories. The original lab was located in Fort Lee, New Jersey along with the studios. A lab was included with the new studio built in Los Angeles in 1916. Headed by Alan E. Freedman, the Fort Lee lab was moved into the new Fox Studios building in Manhattan in 1919. In 1932, Freedman bought the labs from Fox for $2,000,000 to bolster what at that time was a failing Fox liquidity. He renamed the operation "DeLuxe Laboratories," which much later became Deluxe Entertainment Services Group. In the 1940s Freedman sold the labs back to what was then 20th Century Fox and remained as president into the 1960s. Under Freedman's leadership, DeLuxe added two more labs in Chicago and Toronto and processed film from studios other than Fox, such as UA and Universal.

Divisions

Current 
 20th Century Family is an American family-friendly production division of 20th Century Studios. Besides family-friendly theatrical films, the division oversees mixed media (live-action with animation), family animated holiday television specials based on film properties, and film features based on TV shows. On October 30, 2017, Morrison was transferred from her post as president of 20th Century Animation, the prior Fox Family Films, to be president of a newly created 20th Century Fox division, Fox Family, which as a mandate similar to Fox Family Films. The division pick up supervision of a Bob's Burgers film and some existing deals with animation producers done via Gerard Bevan and Andy Watts, including Tonko House. With the sale of 21st Century Fox to Disney in March 2019, rights to The Dam Keeper feature animated film returned to Tonko House. With the August 2019 20th Century Fox slate overhaul announcement, 20th Century Fox properties such as Home Alone, Night at the Museum, Diary of a Wimpy Kid, Cheaper by the Dozen, and the Ice Age spin-off have been assigned for Disney+ release and assigned to 20th Century Family. On March 12, 2020, Morrison was named president, Streaming, Walt Disney Studios Motion Picture Production to oversee live action development and production of Walt Disney Pictures and 20th Century Studios for Disney+.
 20th Century Animation is an American animation studio organized as a division of 20th Century Studios, a subsidiary of Walt Disney Studios. Originally formed in 1994 as its subsidiary, it is tasked with producing feature-length films. At one point divisions were Fox Animation Studios until 2000 and Blue Sky Studios until 2021. Its successful films and franchises include Don Bluth's Anastasia, The Simpsons Movie, and Blue Sky's Ice Age and Rio film series.
 20th Digital Studio is an American web series and web films production and distribution company, founded in 2008 as a digital media, and is a subsidiary of 20th Century Studios.
  is an American video game licensor that was founded in 2021. Beforehand, Fox and later Disney used the standard 20th Century Fox/Studios brand for licensing video games. Before that, Fox had their own publishing division—Fox Interactive, which was founded in 1994 and sold to Vivendi Universal Games in March 2003 and later dissolved in 2006.
  is a comic publishing company formed on March 2023. Beforehand, Fox had its own comic division under its now-defunct Fox Atomic brand.

Former 
 Fox 2000 Pictures was a former American sister studio of the larger film studios 20th Century Fox and Fox Searchlight Pictures specializing in producing independent films in mid-range releases that largely targeted mid-ranged groups. The company dissolved in May 2021 following the release of The Woman in the Window on Netflix, and the acquisition of 21st Century Fox by The Walt Disney Company in March 2019. Its successful films include Marley & Me, Life of Pi, The Fault in Our Stars, Love, Simon, Fight Club, and both Alvin and the Chipmunks and Diary of a Wimpy Kid film series.
 Fox Studios  was a former group of three major movie studios, each part of the defunct Fox Entertainment Group. The three film studios were Fox Studios Australia in Sydney, Australia, Fox Studios Baja in Lower California and the oldest studio, Fox Studios in Century City, home of 20th Century Fox. Disney continues to own Fox Studios Australia, now known as Disney Studios Australia. Fox Entertainment Group sold off the Baja Studios in 2007, and the Century City studios were retained by Fox Corporation, although Disney remains a major tenant at the facility.
 Fox VFX Lab was a former visual effects company division of 20th Century Fox that was acquired in 2017 known as Technoprops. It is led by president John Kilkenny. Besides their visual effects activities, the division oversaw different parts of the world to apply for and work on projects that include films such as Avatar, Rise of the Planet of the Apes, Alita: Battle Angel, The Jungle Book, Rogue One, Teenage Mutant Ninja Turtles: Out of the Shadows, Doctor Strange, and Warcraft and also video game properties like Need for Speed (2015), Battlefield 1, Rainbow Six Siege, Watch Dogs 2, Just Cause 3, Rise of the Tomb Raider, Assassin's Creed Syndicate, Mafia III, Halo 4, Street Fighter V, Call of Duty (Call of Duty: Advanced Warfare and Black Ops III), Far Cry (Far Cry 5 and Primal), Mortal Kombat (X and 11), and Sonic the Hedgehog (Forces and Team Sonic Racing). In 2020, Disney merged Fox VFX Lab into Lucasfilm's Industrial Light & Magic, using the Technoprops brand for the labs technology division, the majority of employees and executives were reportedly fired.
 Fox Atomic is a former youth-focused film production company and division of Fox Filmed Entertainment that operated from 2006 to April 2009. Atomic was originally paired with either 20th Century Fox or its Fox Searchlight division under their same, respective leadership. In late 2006, Fox Atomic was started up under Fox Searchlight head Peter Rice and COO John Hegeman as a sibling production division under Fox Filmed Entertainment. Debbie Liebling transferred to Fox Atomic in 2007 from Fox. In January 2008, Atomic's marketing unit was transferred to Fox Searchlight and 20th Century Fox, when Hegeman moved to Regency Enterprises. Debbie Liebling became president. After two middling successes and falling short with other films, the unit was shut down in April 2009. The remaining films under Atomic in production and post-productions were transferred to 20th Century Fox and Fox Searchlight with Liebling overseeing them.
 Turistas (December 1, 2006)
 The Hills Have Eyes 2 (March 23, 2007)
 28 Weeks Later (May 11, 2007)
 Death Sentence (August 31, 2007)
 The Comebacks (October 12, 2007)
 Shutter (March 21, 2008)
 Deception (April 25, 2008)
 The Rocker (August 22, 2008)
 Miss March (March 6, 2009)
 12 Rounds (March 27, 2009)
 Films transferred during production to other Fox units
 I Love You, Beth Cooper (July 10, 2009) 20th Century Fox release, 1492 Pictures production company, directed by Chris Columbus and starring Hayden Panettiere
 Post Grad (August 21, 2009) Fox Searchlight release, directed by Vicky Jenson and starring Alexis Bledel
 Jennifer's Body (September 18, 2009) 20th Century Fox release, directed by Karyn Kusama and starring Megan Fox
 Fox Faith is a former evangelical Christian-based film production company and division of Fox Filmed Entertainment that operated from 2006 to 2010. In addition to being paired with 20th Century Fox and Fox Searchlight, it was also paired with Fox's home video division, though has had theatrical limited release agreements with AMC Theatres and Carmike Theatres chains. Fox Faith was considered from the studio as "morally-driven, family-friendly programming," and requires them to "have overt Christian [c]ontent or be derived from the work of a Christian author." Faith was located in the Republic of Palau within the Pacific Ocean until 2010 when the company ceased operations and was formed as 20th Century Fox Palau. Its final film, Mama, I Want to Sing!, was filmed in 2009, but was shelved until 2012 due to the studio's closure.
 Love's Abiding Joy (September 1, 2006)
 One Night with the King (October 13, 2006)
 Thr3e (January 5, 2007)
 The Last Sin Eater (February 9, 2007)
 The Ultimate Gift (March 9, 2007)
 The Final Inquiry / L'Inchiesta (May 25, 2007)
 Saving Sarah Cain (August 19, 2007)
 Moondance Alexander (October 19, 2007)
 Ace of Hearts (May 6, 2008)
 A Good Man Is Hard to Find (August 14, 2009)
 Mama, I Want to Sing! (February 12, 2012)
 20th Century Fox Consumer Products (also known as Fox Consumer Products) is a former American merchandising company founded in 1995. it is 20th Century Fox's merchandise division. In 2019, 20th Century Fox Consumer Products was folded into Disney Consumer Products. TCFCP is the management of the rights derived from films and television series produced by the group. it used to license and market properties worldwide on behalf of 20th Century Fox, 20th Century Fox Television and FX Networks, as well as third party lines. The division was aligned with 20th Century Fox Television, the flagship studio leading the industry in supplying award-winning and blockbuster primetime television programming and entertainment content and 20th Century Fox, one of the world's largest producers and distributors of motion pictures throughout the world. 20th Century Fox Consumer Products engaged in merchandising of the Fox brand and Fox properties.
 Fox Stage Productions is the former Broadway-style music show branch founded in June 2013 by the 21st Century Fox conglomerate. after the acquisition in 2019, Fox Stage Productions was shut down to make way for Buena Vista Theatrical on July 3, 2019.
 Fox International Productions is the former division of 20th Century Fox (now 20th Century Studios) in charge of local production in 12 territories in China, Europe, India and Latin America from 2008 to 2017. In 2008, 20th Century Fox started Fox International Productions under president Sanford Panitch. The company had $900 million in box-office receipts by the time Panitch left the company for Sony Pictures on June 2, 2015. Co-president of worldwide theatrical marketing and distribution for 20th Century Fox Tomas Jegeus was named president of Fox International Productions effective September 1, 2015. The company struck a development and production deal in November 2015 with Zhejiang Huace, a Chinese entertainment group. In December 2017, 20th Century Fox film chairman-CEO Stacey Snider indicated that Fox International Productions would be dissolved in favor of each local and regional offices producing or acquiring projects.
 20th Century Fox International is the former international division of 20th Century Fox, responsible for the distribution of films outside the United States and indirectly for the distribution of home videos and DVDs.

 Fox-Paramount Home Entertainment is a former Nordic joint venture between 20th Century Fox Home Entertainment and Paramount Home Entertainment, founded in 2013 to manage manufacturing, distribution, marketing, and sales of each studio's Blu-ray and DVD releases, as well as sales support for digital products in the Nordic region. In 2020, following the renaming for and folding of 20th Century Fox Home Entertainment (now 20th Century Home Entertainment), Fox-Paramount Home Entertainment was defunct and separated. Now home media releases for 20th Century Studios' films in Nordic are directly managed by Walt Disney Studios Home Entertainment, while SF Studios only releasing its own films from Paramount Pictures since July 2021.

Logo and fanfare

20th Century Fox is perhaps best known for its production logo. The familiar 20th Century Fox logo originated as the logo of Twentieth Century Pictures and was adopted by 20th Century-Fox after the merger in 1935. It consists of a stacked block-letter three-dimensional, monolithic logotype (nicknamed "the Monument") surrounded by Art deco buildings and illuminated by searchlights. In the production logo that appears at the start of films, the searchlights are animated and the sequence is accompanied by a distinctive fanfare that was originally composed in 1933 by Alfred Newman. The original layout of the logo was designed by special effects animator and matte painting artist Emil Kosa Jr..

The 20th Century Fox logo and fanfare have been recognized as an iconic symbol of the Golden Age of Hollywood.

In 1953, Rocky Longo, an artist at Pacific Title, was hired to recreate the original logo design for the new CinemaScope picture process. Longo tilted the "0" in "20th" to have the logo maintain proportions in the wider CinemaScope format. Alfred Newman also re-composed the logo's fanfare with an extension to be heard during the CinemaScope logo that would follow after the Fox logo. Although the format had since declined, director George Lucas specifically requested that the CinemaScope version of the fanfare be used for the opening titles of Star Wars (1977). Additionally, the film's main theme was composed by John Williams in the same key as the fanfare (B major), serving as an extension to it of sorts. In 1981, the logo was slightly altered with the re-straightening of the "0" in "20th".

In 1994, after a few failed attempts, Fox in-house television producer Kevin Burns was hired to produce a new logo for the company, this time using the then-new process of computer-generated imagery (CGI) adding more detail and animation, with the longer 21-second Fox fanfare arranged by Bruce Broughton used as the underscore, and a byline reading "A NEWS CORPORATION COMPANY". It would later be re-recorded by David Newman in 1997 and again in 1998. The logo was animated by Burns alongside Flip Your Lid Animation (also the studio made a prototype logos where are consindered lost until it was found on internet like YouTube and Archive.org) and made its debut on True Lies (1994).

In 2009, an updated logo created by Blue Sky Studios (a prototype version of the 2009 structure exists) debuted with the release of Avatar. Blue Sky Studios also created a "Celebrating 75 Years" variant in 2010, which was used from Percy Jackson & the Olympians: The Lightning Thief  to Gulliver's Travels. In 2013, the logo without the News Corporation byline made its debut on DreamWorks Animation's Turbo.

On September 16, 2014, 20th Century Fox posted a video showcasing all of the various versions of the logo, plus the "William Fox Presents" version of the Fox Film logo and the 20th Century Pictures logo, including some variations, up until the 2009 version of the logo, with the 1998 re-arrangement version of the 1997 version of the fanfare composed by David Newman, to promote the new Fox Movies website.

On January 17, 2020, it was reported that Disney had begun to phase out the "Fox" name from the studio's branding as it is no longer tied to the current Fox Corporation, with 20th Century Fox and Fox Searchlight Pictures respectively renamed to 20th Century Studios and Searchlight Pictures. Branding elements associated with the studio, including the searchlights, monolith, and fanfare, will remain in use. The first film that carries the new 20th Century Studios name is The Call of the Wild (coincidentally the original film adaptation was the original Twentieth Century Pictures' final movie before its merger with Fox Film).

For the 20th Century Studios logo, its print logo debuted on a movie poster of The New Mutants while the on-screen logo debuted in a television advertisement for and the full version debuted on February 21, 2020, with the film The Call of the Wild.

The 20th Century Studios logo was animated by Picturemill (the prototype version of the 2020 structure and the 2021 structure with the 2009 sky background exists and appeared in some of Picturemill reels), based on Blue Sky Studios' animation. It features a much different sky backdrop, the Los Angeles skyline is larger and more detailed, and the rest of the structure appears darker with more realistic lighting. On Picturemill's spring 2020 reel and starting with Free Guy (2021), the logo is more enhanced with the sky backdrop in the logo resembling that of the backdrop in the 2009 logo. Additionally, a horizontal version of the print logo was introduced in 2021 starting with Vacation Friends and is mainly used for branding Hulu/Star/Star+ originals, though it was used in Hulu promotional materials for Death on the Nile (2022).

In the television series Futurama, a "30th Century Fox" logo appears after some episodes about its setting; in particular, the company is credited as "30th Century Fox Television" after every episode, and even on the side of the show's DVDs. A fictional "30th" statue was also seen in the season 3 episode "That's Lobstertainment!" as a literal statue and searchlights in Hollywood in the 31st century; a joke is also made that several movies were made each year of the pilots who were blinded by said searchlights and ended up crashing after flying by the statue, one example of which was seen while the characters were touring.

Film library

Film series

Highest-grossing films 
 

 — Includes theatrical reissue(s)

See also 
 20th Century Animation
 20th Century Games
 Searchlight Pictures
 Star Studios
 20th Television
 20th Television Animation

References

Sources 
 
 
 
 
 (Reprint edition) 
 (Kindle edition) 
 
 (First edition) 
 (Kindle edition)

Additional sources 
 
 (First Edition)

Archival sources 
 Finding aid to the Earl I. Sponable papers, 1928-1968, at Columbia University. Rare Book & Manuscript Library.

External links 

 
 20th Century Studios from Box Office Mojo
 

 
1935 establishments in California
American companies established in 1935
American film studios
Articles containing video clips
Century City, Los Angeles
Cinema of Southern California
Companies based in Los Angeles
Disney acquisitions
Disney production studios
Entertainment companies based in California
Entertainment companies established in 1935
Film distributors of the United States
Film production companies of the United States
Former News Corporation subsidiaries
Fox Film
Mass media companies established in 1935
Organizations awarded an Academy Honorary Award
Recipients of the Scientific and Technical Academy Award of Merit
Walt Disney Studios (division)